Filet mignon is a cut of meat taken from the smaller end of the tenderloin, or psoas major of a cow. In French, it mostly refers to cuts of pork tenderloin.

The tenderloin runs along both sides of the spine, and is usually butchered as two long snake-shaped cuts of meat. The tenderloin is sometimes sold whole. Filet mignon is usually presented as a round cut taken from the thinner end of a piece of tenderloin. It is often the most tender and lean cut. Filet mignon often has a milder flavour than other cuts of meat and as such is often garnished with a sauce or wrapped with bacon.

Due to the small amount of filet mignon able to be butchered from each animal it is generally considered one of the most expensive cuts of beef.

Usage

Europe 

In France, the term filet mignon refers to pork. The cut of beef referred to as filet mignon in the United States has various names across the rest of Europe. E.g. filet de bœuf in French, fillet steak in the UK, oxfilé in Swedish, Filetsteak in German, solomillo in Spanish (filete in Catalan), filé mignon in Portuguese, filee steik in Estonian, and filetbiff in Norwegian. 

In the UK, pork medallion is the term used to describe a similar cut from a pig.

North America 
Filet mignon refers to cuts from a beef tenderloin in North America.
Elsewhere, this cut of beef is called:
 Filet de bœuf (French)
Fillet steak (English: UK, Ireland, South Africa)
 Eye fillet (English: Australia, New Zealand).

In the U.S., both the central and large end of the tenderloin are often sold as filet mignon in supermarkets and restaurants. The French terms for these cuts are tournedos (the smaller central portion),  châteaubriand (the larger central portion), and biftek (cut from the large end known as the tête de filet (lit. "head of filet") in French).

Porterhouse steaks and T-bone steaks are large cuts that include the filet. The small medallion on one side of the bone is the filet, and the long strip of meat on the other side of the bone is the strip steak.

Preparation

Filet mignon may be cut into 1- to 2-inch (2.5 to 5 cm) thick portions, then grilled    and served as-is. One also may find filet mignon in stores already cut into portions and wrapped with bacon. High heat is the usual method for cooking the filet mignon, either grilling, pan frying, broiling, or roasting.

Bacon is often used in cooking filet mignon because of the low levels of fat found in the cut (see barding), as filets have low levels of marbling, or intramuscular fat. Bacon is wrapped around the filet and pinned closed with a wooden toothpick. This adds flavor and keeps the filet from drying out during the cooking process.

Traditional cooking calls for the filet mignon to be seared on each side using intense heat for a short time and then transferred to a lower heat to cook the meat all the way through.

See also
 Pork tenderloin
Beef tenderloin

References

Sources
 

Cuts of beef